The Okeechobee High School (1925) is an historic redbrick school building located at 610 SW 2nd Avenue in Okeechobee, Florida. Designed by architects William Hatcher and Lawrence Funke, it was built in 1925 by Rogers and Duncanson. In 1989, it was listed in A Guide to Florida's Historic Architecture, published by the University of Florida Press.

The new Okeechobee High School is now located at 2800 Highway 441 North and the 1925 building is the Okeechobee Freshman Campus.

References

Schools in Okeechobee County, Florida
Public high schools in Florida
School buildings completed in 1925
1925 establishments in Florida